Ivan Nikolov (born 17 February 2002) is a Macedonian professional footballer who plays as a defensive midfielder for Bregalnica in the First Macedonian Football League.

Career

Club career
Nikolov made his senior football debut on 31 August 2019 at the age of 17, by playing the full match for Akademija Pandev against Rabotnichki in the fourth round of the 2019–20 Macedonian First Football League season. That season he went on to play 7 games, throughout which he also assisted one goal.

International
Ever since 2018 Nikolov has been regular at most of North Macedonia's national youth teams.

He made his debut for North Macedonia national football team on 22 October 2022 in a friendly match against Saudi Arabia.

References

External links
 
 

2002 births
Living people
Sportspeople from Štip
Association football midfielders
Macedonian footballers
North Macedonia youth international footballers
North Macedonia under-21 international footballers
North Macedonia international footballers
FK Vardar players
Akademija Pandev players
FK Bregalnica Štip players
Macedonian First Football League players